The women's 100 metre breaststroke event at the 2022 Commonwealth Games was held on 1 and 2 August at the Sandwell Aquatics Centre.

Records
Prior to this competition, the existing world, Commonwealth and Games records were as follows:

Schedule
The schedule is as follows:

All times are British Summer Time (UTC+1)

Results

Heats

Semifinals

Final

References

Women's 100 metre breaststroke
Commonwealth Games